Puget-Rostang is a commune in the Alpes-Maritimes département in southeastern France.

Geography
The commune is traversed by the Cianavelle and the Raton River.

The climate is Mediterranean, tempered by the  altitude. Winters are brisk, but with no snow.

The village lies at the confluence of the Mairola and the Riou d’Auvare. The valley of the Mairola lies east and west and is dominated by the Mount Cimaillon (1514 m), which was topped by a castle.

Economy
Until the middle of the 19th century, the village raised just enough to feed itself. Grain grew poorly in the rocky soil, and the vineyards only provided enough for family consumption. Each family had a few sheep and a couple of goats. The only notable product was prunes.

Since that time, artisanal products have dominated the economy. An eco-museum featuring tools and implements attracts visitors to the region.

Population

See also
Communes of the Alpes-Maritimes department

References

Communes of Alpes-Maritimes
Alpes-Maritimes communes articles needing translation from French Wikipedia